Hubert Laws (born November 10, 1939) is an American flutist and saxophonist with a career spanning over 40 years in jazz, classical, and other music genres.  Laws is one of the few classical artists who has also mastered jazz, pop, and rhythm-and-blues genres, moving effortlessly from one repertory to another.

Biography
Hubert Laws, Jr. was born November 10, 1939, in the Studewood section of Houston, Texas, the second of eight children to Hubert Laws, Sr. and Miola Luverta Donahue. Many of his siblings also entered the music industry, including saxophonist Ronnie and vocalists Eloise, Debra, and Johnnie Laws. He began playing flute in high school after volunteering to substitute for the school orchestra's regular flutist. He became adept at jazz improvisation by playing in the Houston-area jazz group the Swingsters, which eventually evolved into the Modern Jazz Sextet, the Night Hawks, and The Crusaders. At the age of 15, he was a member of the early Jazz Crusaders while in Texas (1954–60), and also played classical music during those years.

Winning a scholarship to New York's Juilliard School of Music in 1960, he studied music both in the classroom and with master flutist Julius Baker, and played with both the New York Metropolitan Opera Orchestra (member) and the New York Philharmonic Orchestra through 1969–72. In this period, his renditions of classical compositions by Gabriel Fauré, Stravinsky, Debussy, and Bach on the 1971 CTI recording Rite of Spring—with a string section and such jazz stalwarts as Airto Moreira, Jack DeJohnette, Bob James, and Ron Carter—earned him an audience of classical music aficionados. Laws would return to this genre in 1976 with a recording of Tchaikovsky's Romeo and Juliet.

While at Juilliard, Laws played flute during the evenings with several acts, including Mongo Santamaría through 1963–67, and in 1964, began recording as a bandleader for Atlantic, and he released the albums The Laws of Jazz, Flute By-Laws, and Laws Cause. He appeared on albums by Ashford & Simpson, Chet Baker, George Benson, and Moondog. He recorded with his younger brother Ronnie on the album The Laws in the early 1970s. He played flute on Gil Scott-Heron's 1971 album Pieces of a Man, which featured the jazz poem "The Revolution Will Not Be Televised". During the 1970s, Laws was a member of the New York Jazz Quartet. He can also be heard playing tenor saxophone on some records from the 1970s.

In the 1990s, Laws resumed his career, playing on the 1991 Spirituals in Concert recording by opera singers Kathleen Battle and Jessye Norman. His albums on the Music Masters Jazz label—My Time Will Come in 1990 and, more particularly, Storm Then Calm in 1994—are regarded by critics as a return to the form he exhibited on his early 1970s albums. He also recorded a tribute album to jazz pianist and pop-music vocalist Nat King Cole, Hubert Laws Remembers the Unforgettable Nat King Cole, which received critical accolades. Among the many artists he has played and recorded with are Herbie Hancock, McCoy Tyner, Nancy Wilson, Quincy Jones, Paul McCartney, Paul Simon, Aretha Franklin, Ella Fitzgerald, Sarah Vaughan, Lena Horne, Leonard Bernstein, James Moody, Jaco Pastorius, Sérgio Mendes, Steve Barta, Bob James, Carly Simon, Grant Green, George Benson, Clark Terry, Stevie Wonder, J. J. Johnson, and The Rascals. In 1998, Laws recorded with Morcheeba for the Red Hot Organization's compilation album Red Hot + Rhapsody, a tribute to George Gershwin, which raised money for various charities devoted to increasing AIDS awareness and fighting the disease.

The 2006 video Hubert Laws Live 30-year Video Retrospective includes "Red Hot & Cool" with Nancy Wilson, Performance in Brazil, The Tonight Show Starring Johnny Carson Appearance, The 1975 Down Beat Reader's Poll Awards, Performance in Japan, and Performance in Germany.

Awards and honors
In June 2010, Laws received a lifetime achievement award from the National Endowment for the Arts in the field of jazz.

Laws is a recipient of the 2011 NEA Jazz Masters Award.

Grammy Awards 
Hubert Laws has received the following nominations at the Grammy Awards:

Discography 

 The Laws of Jazz (1964)
 Flute By-Laws (1966)
 Laws' Cause (1969)
 Crying Song (1969)
 Afro-Classic (1970)
 The Rite of Spring (1971)
 Wild Flower (1972) 
 Morning Star (1972)
 Carnegie Hall (1973)
 In the Beginning (1974)
 The Chicago Theme (1975)
 The San Francisco Concert (1975)
 Romeo & Juliet (1976)

References

External links
Hubert Laws official website
Hubert Laws

1939 births
Living people
American jazz flautists
American classical flautists
Musicians from Houston
African-American jazz musicians
African-American classical musicians
American rhythm and blues musicians
New York Jazz Quartet members
American jazz saxophonists
20th-century American saxophonists
CTI Records artists
Columbia Records artists
20th-century African-American musicians
21st-century African-American people
20th-century flautists